Mount Edith is a mountain located in the Bow River valley of Banff National Park. Situated in the Sawback Range, it comprises three limestone peaks (south, centre, north) with the southern peak being the highest followed by the centre and northern peaks respectively. All three peaks can be scrambled with the southern peak demanding the highest difficulty on the west side.

The mountain was named in 1886 for Edith Orde who worked as an assistant to Lady Agnes Macdonald, the wife of Canada's first prime minister.

Geology

Mount Edith is composed of limestone, a sedimentary rock laid down during the Devonian period. Formed in shallow seas, this sedimentary rock was pushed east and over the top of younger rock during the Laramide orogeny.

Climate

Based on the Köppen climate classification, Mount Edith is located in a subarctic climate with cold, snowy winters, and mild summers.

See also
List of mountains of Canada
Geology of Alberta
Mountains of Alberta

References

External links
 National Park Service web site: Banff National Park

Two-thousanders of Alberta
Mountains of Banff National Park